Ray Chen is an American engineer, who is currently the Keys and Joan Curry/Cullen Trust Endowed Chair in the Department of Electrical and Computer Engineering at the University of Texas at Austin. He is a fellow of the Institute of Electrical and Electronics Engineers, The Optical Society and SPIE.

References

Year of birth missing (living people)
Living people
University of Texas at Austin faculty
21st-century American engineers
American people of Taiwanese descent
National Tsing Hua University alumni
University of California alumni